The Biplanes Of Yesteryear Mifyter is an American amateur-built aircraft, designed by Rod Cowgill and produced by Biplanes Of Yesteryear, of Ontario, Oregon. The aircraft is supplied as a kit for amateur construction.

The design is "a fantasy one-of-a-kind design, not a scale" replica, but is intended to be similar to a First World War fighter.

Design and development
The aircraft features a strut-braced biplane layout, a single-seat open cockpit, fixed conventional landing gear and a single engine in tractor configuration.

The aircraft is covered in doped aircraft fabric. The prototype was powered by a  Rotax 532 with the newer  Rotax 582 two-stroke powerplant a builder option. Uniquely, for ground transportation and storage, instead of folding wings the aircraft features a removable tail section.

Operational history
The design has won many awards, including Arlington Champion 1997, Oshkosh Honorable Mention 1997, Arlington Grand Champion 1999, and Oshkosh Reserve Grand Champion 2002.

As of December 2007 one example had been reported as having been completed and in April 2015 only one was registered with the Federal Aviation Administration.

A two-seat Myfyter II was planned and one example reported built, powered by a Geo Metro four stroke engine, although the company does not currently market it.

Specifications (Mifyter)

References

External links

Homebuilt aircraft
Single-engined tractor aircraft
Ontario, Oregon